N,N-Diisopropylethylamine, or Hünig's base, is an organic compound and an amine. It is named after the German chemist Siegfried Hünig. It is used in organic chemistry as a base. It is commonly abbreviated as DIPEA, DIEA, or ''i''-Pr2NEt.

Structure 
DIPEA consists of a central nitrogen atom that is bonded to an ethyl group and two isopropyl groups. A lone pair of electrons resides on the nitrogen atom, which can react with electrophiles. However, as the two isopropyl groups and the ethyl group occupy much of the space surrounding the N atom, only small electrophiles such as protons can react with the nitrogen lone pair.

Occurrence and preparation 
DIPEA is commercially available. It is traditionally prepared by the alkylation of diisopropylamine with diethyl sulfate.

Pure DIPEA exists as a colorless liquid, although commercial samples can be slightly yellow. If necessary, the compound can be purified by distillation from potassium hydroxide or calcium hydride.

Uses and reactions
DIPEA is a sterically hindered organic base that is commonly employed as a proton scavenger. Thus, like 2,2,6,6-tetramethylpiperidine and triethylamine, DIPEA is a good base but a poor nucleophile, DIPEA has low solubility in water, which makes it very easily recovered in commercial processes, a combination of properties that makes it a useful organic reagent.

Amide coupling 
It is commonly used as the hindered base in amide coupling reactions between a carboxylic acid (typically activated, for example, as an acid chloride, as illustrated below) and a nucleophilic amine. As DIPEA is hindered and poorly nucleophilic, it does not compete with the nucleophilic amine in the coupling reaction.

Alkylations 
DIPEA has been investigated for its use as a selective reagent in the alkylation of secondary amines to tertiary amines by alkyl halides. This is often hampered by an unwanted Menshutkin reaction forming a quaternary ammonium salt, but is absent when DIPEA is present.

Transition metal catalyzed cross-coupling reactions 
DIPEA can be used as a base in a number of transition metal catalyzed cross-coupling reactions, such as the Heck coupling and the Sonogashira coupling (as illustrated below).

Swern oxidation 
Although triethylamine is traditionally employed as the hindered base in Swern oxidations, the structurally similar DIPEA can be used instead, as exemplified below.

Examples of DIPEA used as a substrate 
DIPEA forms a complex heterocyclic compound called scorpionine (bis([1,2]dithiolo)-[1,4]thiazine) upon reaction with disulfur dichloride that is catalyzed by DABCO in a one-pot synthesis.

Comparison with triethylamine 
DIPEA and triethylamine are structurally very similar, with both compounds considered hindered organic bases. Due to their structural similarity, DIPEA and triethylamine can be used interchangeably in most applications. The nitrogen atom in DIPEA is more shielded than the nitrogen atom in triethylamine. However, triethylamine is a slightly stronger base than DIPEA; the pKas of the respective conjugate acids in dimethyl sulfoxide are 9.0 and 8.5, respectively.

References

Alkylamines
Non-nucleophilic bases
Diisopropylamino compounds
Tertiary amines